Lady Moyra Butler (2 December 1920 – 26 May 1959) was the daughter of James George Anson Butler, 5th Marquess of Ormonde and The Honourable Sybil Fellowes. She was one of the last members of the Butler Dynasty to reside at Kilkenny Castle. Her maternal grandmother was the sister of Lord Randolph Churchill, making Lady Moyra the first cousin once-removed of Winston Churchill.

Early life

At the time of Lady Moyra's birth, her parents (then known as the Earl and Countess of Ossory) had taken up residence at Kilkenny Castle, following the death of Moyra's great-uncle James Butler, 3rd Marquess of Ormonde. Her grandfather Arthur Butler, 4th Marquess of Ormonde had requested that his older brother leave the family estates to Moyra's father. The Third Marquess left an estate of some £450,000, which had attracted death duties of over £160,000, and this decision to bypass Moyra's grandfather's inheritance was an attempt to avoid burdening the Ormonde Estates with death duties upon the death of the 4th Marquess, who had also married an American heiress Ellen Sprague Stager, daughter of Union General Anson  Stager in 1887. The 4th Marquess and his wife had their own estate at Gennings Park in Kent. 

In 1935, Lord and Lady Ossory and their children left Kilkenny Castle, and the contents were sold. The family maintained an apartment at the Castle over the stables, and during their extended stays in Ireland the family shooting lodge, Ballyknockane, was their residence. The income generated by the Ormonde Estates had been in steady decline during the early decades of the 20th century; in 1900 income from rents, invested capital, grazing, and timber sales amounted to approximately £44,000; by 1935 this had fallen to approximately £11,000 (£6,300 in 1900 when adjusted for inflation). Increases in taxes, staff wages and upkeep costs also diminished the ability of Lord Ossory to maintain the household at Kilkenny Castle.

The 3rd Marquess had left the Ormonde Estates in Trust for the male-line descendants of the second Marquess, and then his own daughters. In 1938, the 4th Marquess, his son George, Earl of Ossory, and grandson Anthony, Viscount Thurles executed a Deed of Resettlement which also settled the Ormonde Estates on the male-line descendants of the Second Marquess, but with a reversionary interest to Lady Moyra, rather than the daughters of the Third Marquess.

Debutante

In March 1938, a profile of prominent debutantes in The Bystander featured a profile of Lady Moyra, and noted that she had just returned to England from a six-month stay in Germany.  

Moyra was presented at Court in May 1938. Lord and Lady Ossory hosted a large ball at the London townhouse of the Marquess and Marchioness of Ormonde, 11 Bryanston Square, in June 1938 during Lady Moyra's debutant season. This dance was a joint coming-of-age party for Lady Moyra's brother, Anthony Viscount Thurles, as well as a debutant 'coming-out' party for Moyra. The guest list reported in newspapers at the time provides some insight into the high social standing of the Butler family; among the guests who accepted invitations were the United States Ambassador Joseph Kennedy (father of US President John F. Kennedy) and his daughter Kathleen (later Marchioness of Hartlington), The Earl and Countess of Airlie, Queen Victoria's grandson the Marquess of Carisbrooke, Viscount and Viscountess Curzon, Earl and Countess FitzWilliam, Earl and Countess Spencer, the Duke and Duchess of Marlborough, the Duchess of Northumberland, and the Earl and Countess of Shrewsbury.

Moyra also attended a debutante ball given by Rose Kennedy (wife of U.S. Ambassador Joseph P. Kennedy) for her daughters Kathleen and Rosemary at the American Embassy in London in May 1938.

In 1939 Lord Ossory, Lady Ossory, and Lady Moyra were recorded as living in inner-northern London at 30 St John's Wood Park. Despite the reduced circumstances of the family, a Butler, Cook, Housemaid, Kitchenmaid, and Lady's Maid were also recorded as living at this address. Prior to her marriage, she appeared in newspaper advertisements for Ponds Creams.

Marriages and Second World War

On 30 April 1940, Lady Moyra married Lt. Charles Weld-Forester at St George's Church, Hanover Square. Lt Weld-Forester was the son of Major the Hon. Edric Weld-Forester and Lady Victoria of Laverton House, Broadway, Worcestershire. Queen Mary sent a telegram of congratulations to Lt Weld-Forester; his mother had previously served as her Lady-in-Waiting. It was reported that the Duke and Duchess of Marlborough, and Winston and Clementine Churchill were invited to the wedding. Eight days later, tragedy struck when her brother, Anthony, Viscount Thurles, died.  

On 5 June 1940 Lt Wed-Forester was reported as missing following the defence of Calais. On 19 July 1940 it was reported that he was wounded and captured during the defence of Calais. During her husband's time as a Prisoner of War, Lady Moyra was reported to be the only female transport driver attached to the British Red Cross Prisoners of War Department in February 1942.

On 23 April 1946 Lady Moyra gave birth to the couple's only child, Piers Weld-Forester.

On 19 December 1947, Moyra's husband Charles sued her for divorce, on the basis that she had committed adultery with Belgian Count Guy van den Steen de Jehay. 'on the continent last summer'. Lady Moyra did not defend the suit, and a decree nisi was granted with costs against Count Guy van den Steen. On 3 August 1948 Guy and Lady Moyra were married in Chelsea, London. Their only son Gerard was born in London on 10 October 1949.

Belgium

In the 1940s, Count Guy van den Steen inherited his family's ancestral home, the Chateau de Jehay. He reported that it was a 'dark, empty shell, surrounded by flat, uncultivated fields' at the time he came into possession of the Chateau. Lady Moyra and Count Guy moved into the Castle in 1950, and worked to restore the Chateau, and many Ormonde heirlooms can be found in the Chateau today.

Lady Moyra and her son Gerard were photographed for the Tatler and Bystander, and appeared on 25 January 1956 in the publication. An accompanying article noted that Moyra and her second husband Guy owned two miniture-Chalets in Grindelwald, Switzerland, where they spent the winter season skiing and entertaining friends each year.

Death and descendants

Lady Moyra died at the Chateau de Jehay, Belgium on 26 May 1959 at the age of 38. 

Her first son Piers Weld-Forester was a prominent figure in London society in the late 1960s and early 1970s. Described as a 'playboy in the true sense of the word', he was briefly the boyfriend of Princess Anne in 1971 and went on to become a motorcycle racer. He was killed in a motorcycle crash in 1977. During his lifetime, Piers was one of the last remaining male members of the Butler Dynasty, along with his great-uncle Arthur Butler, 6th Marquess of Ormonde and first cousin twice-removed Charles Butler, 7th Marquess of Ormonde. Upon the transfer of the family's ancestral home Kilkenny Castle to the local government in 1967, the remainder of the Ormonde Family Trust was wound up and split equally between the 6th Marquess, Charles Butler (later 7th Marquess) and Piers.

Her second son Gerard married in 1974 and had three daughters. He predeceased his father, dying on 15 April 1985. Count Guy left the Chateau de Jehay to the Province of Liege upon his death in 1999.

References

External links
 

1920 births
1959 deaths
Butler dynasty